The 2010 Tim Hortons Brier, the Canadian men's national curling championship, was held between March 6 until March 14, 2010 in Halifax, Nova Scotia at the Halifax Metro Centre. It marked the sixth time the Brier had been to Halifax, and the second time in eight years, having previously hosted the 2003 Nokia Brier.

The 2010 Brier was without its two-time defending champions, the Kevin Martin Alberta rink, which did not participate in playdowns, instead focusing on the 2010 Winter Olympics. Alberta was represented for the first time by the former Canada Cup champion, Kevin Koe. Koe's brother, Jamie skipped the Northwest Territories/Yukon team for the fourth time. The 2010 was the second Brier in a row where two brothers skipped different teams (2009 was Glenn Howard vs. Russ Howard.) Glenn Howard represented Ontario once again, having won a record fifth straight provincial championship. However his brother Russ did not compete in the playdowns for New Brunswick. That province was represented by Russ' former third, James Grattan. The 1996 and 1999 Brier champion Jeff Stoughton skipped for Manitoba for the eighth time, a record for that province. Former Olympic gold medalist Brad Gushue skipped for Newfoundland and Labrador for the seventh time in eight years.

Rounding out the field were Darrell McKee of Saskatchewan in his third Brier, Rod MacDonald who skipped Prince Edward Island for the third time, Brad Jacobs of Northern Ontario playing in his third Brier, Jeff Richard of British Columbia, Serge Reid of Quebec and Ian Fitzner-LeBlanc who all played their first Briers.

Kevin Koe's Alberta rink defeated Glenn Howard of Ontario in the final with a score of 6–5 to win the 2010 Tim Hortons Brier.

Teams

Round-robin standings
Final round-robin standings

Round-robin results
All draw times are listed in Atlantic Standard Time (UTC−4).

Draw 1
Saturday, March 6, 3:00 pm

Draw 2
Saturday, March 6, 8:00 pm

Draw 3
Sunday, March 7, 10:00 am

Draw 4
Sunday, March 7, 3:00 pm

Draw 5
Sunday, March 7, 8:00 pm

Draw 6
Monday, March 8, 10:00 am

Draw 7
Monday, March 8, 3:00 pm

Draw 8
Monday, March 8, 8:00 pm

Draw 9
Tuesday, March 9, 10:00 am

Draw 10
Tuesday, March 9, 3:00 pm

Draw 11
Tuesday, March 9, 8:00 pm

Draw 12
Wednesday, March 10, 10:00 am

Draw 13
Wednesday, March 10, 3:00 pm

Draw 14
Wednesday, March 10, 8:00 pm

Draw 15
Thursday, March 11, 10:00 am

Draw 16
Thursday, March 11, 3:00 pm

Draw 17
Thursday, March 11, 8:00 pm

Playoffs

1 vs. 2
Friday, March 12, 8:00 pm

3 vs. 4
Saturday, March 13, 11:00 am

Semifinal
Saturday, March 13, 8:00 pm

Final
Sunday, March 14, 8:00 pm

Top 5 player percentages
Round Robin only

References

External links

 
Curling competitions in Halifax, Nova Scotia
2010 in Nova Scotia
2010 in Canadian curling
The Brier